Fighting Spirit Unleashed (2019) was a professional wrestling three-event tour promoted by New Japan Pro-Wrestling (NJPW). The three events took place from September 27 to 29, 2019 at the Lowell Memorial Auditorium in Lowell, Massachusetts, the Hammerstein Ballroom in New York City, New York and the 2300 Arena in Philadelphia, Pennsylvania.

Production

Background
On July 6, 2019, during the opening night of the G1 Climax tournament, NJPW announced their return to the United States to host a 2019 edition of Fighting Spirit Unleashed, a three-event tour across the East Coast of the United States at the end of September. The cities hosting the three events were announced by NJPW as Lowell, New York City and Philadelphia. Tickets went on sale on July 26.

The New York event was streamed live worldwide on NJPW's streaming service, NJPW World, with Japanese commentary. The Lowell and Philadelphia events were later made available for on demand viewing.

Storylines
Fighting Spirit Unleashed featured seven to eight professional wrestling matches in each show that involved different wrestlers from pre-existing scripted feuds and storylines. Wrestlers portray villains, heroes, or less distinguishable characters in the scripted events that build tension and culminate in a wrestling match or series of matches.

Results

Night 1 (Lowell)

Night 2 (New York)

Night 3 (Philadelphia)

References

External links
Official New Japan Pro-Wrestling website

2019 in professional wrestling
New Japan Pro-Wrestling shows
September 2019 events in the United States